La sacamos del estadio is a 2018 Peruvian sports comedy film written and directed by Oswaldo Aldana in his directorial debut. It stars Emanuel Soriano, Macla Yamada, Bruno Odar, Andrea Luna, Javier Dulzaidas, Nicolás Fantinato, Marisela Puicón and José Dammert. It premiered on June 7, 2018 in Peruvian theaters.

Synopsis 
Nicolás, a soccer fan who dreams of going to the World Cup in Russia to follow his soccer team, which qualified after 36 years. His motivation is to be able to take his father, from whom he has inherited his passion and who could not see the qualifying match.

Cast 
The actors participating in this film are:

 Emanuel Soriano as Nicolás
 Macla Yamada as Patricia
 Nicolás Fantinato
 Marisela Puicón
 Andrea Luna
 Bruno Odar
 Nicolás Argolo
 José Dammert
 Javier Dulzaides
 Georgette Cárdenas
 Gianina Marquina
 Aaron Olazabal

References 

2018 films
2018 comedy films
Peruvian sports comedy films
2010s Spanish-language films
2010s Peruvian films
Films set in Peru
Films shot in Peru
Films about father–son relationships
2018 directorial debut films